"Rock of Ages" is a song by Def Leppard from their 1983 album Pyromania. When issued as a single in the United States, the song reached #16 on the Billboard Hot 100 chart and #19 on the Cash Box Top 100.  It also hit #1 on the Top Tracks Rock chart.

In 2012, the band re-recorded the song, along with "Pour Some Sugar on Me", under the title "Rock of Ages 2012". Both were released digitally on 4 June 2012.

Lyrics
The song begins with "Gunter glieben glauten globen", a German-like nonsense phrase introduced by Mutt Lange, who is of German descent. According to the official Def Leppard ,

As the song's melody begins, Elliott speaks the lines, "All right/I've got something to say/It's better to burn out/Than to fade away"; the second two lines are a reference to Neil Young's song "Hey Hey, My My (Out of the Blue)". Def Leppard's four-line version was quoted in the 1986 movie Highlander by the film's villain, the Kurgan.  Young's line would later become immortalized in rock history when it was used in the suicide note of grunge pioneer Kurt Cobain.

During the guitar solo, several vocal phrases were backmasked. When played forward, the phrases "Fuck the Russians" and "Brezhnev's got herpes" can be heard.

Title
According to the liner notes of the compilation release Rock of Ages: The Definitive Collection, the band was at a recording studio when lead vocalist Joe Elliott stumbled upon a hymn book left by a member of a children's choir that had just used the studio. In the book, he saw the words "Rock of Ages", which prompted him to write the lyrics of the song.

Reception
Cash Box described it as a powerful rock anthem that "pulls out just about every 'Long live rock ‘n’ roll' cliche there is."

Music video
The music video was directed by David Mallet and shot on 8 December 1982 (Guitarist Phil Collen's 25th birthday), in Battersea, London, England. Former Def Leppard co-manager Peter Mensch appears in this video as one of the monks.

The song's video was placed on New York Times list of the 15 Essential Hair-Metal Videos.

Track listing

7": Vertigo / VER6 (812 858-7) (UK) 
 "Rock of Ages"
 "Action! Not Words"

12": Vertigo / VERX6 (812 293-1) (UK) 
 "Rock of Ages"
 "Action! Not Words"

7": Mercury / 812 604-7 (US) 
 "Rock Of Ages"
 "Billy's Got A Gun"

Personnel

Def Leppard
Joe Elliott – lead vocals
Phil Collen – guitar solo, backing vocals
Steve Clark – lead and rhythm guitar
Vivian Campbell - rhythm guitar, backing vocals (2012 re-recording)
Pete Willis – rhythm guitar
Rick Savage – bass guitar, backing vocals 
Rick Allen – drums

Additional musicians
Robert John "Mutt" Lange – spoken word intro, backing vocals
Thomas Dolby – keyboards
Rocky Newton - backing vocals

Charts

See also
List of number-one mainstream rock hits (United States)
List of glam metal albums and songs

References

Def Leppard songs
1983 singles
Songs written by Robert John "Mutt" Lange
Song recordings produced by Robert John "Mutt" Lange
1983 songs
Songs written by Joe Elliott
Songs written by Steve Clark
Mercury Records singles
Vertigo Records singles
Music videos directed by David Mallet (director)